Edey is a surname. Notable people with the surname include:

Cec Edey (born 1965), British footballer
Moses Chamberlain Edey (1845–1919), Canadian architect
Tim Edey, British multi-instrumentalist and composer
Tyler Edey (born 1980), Canadian pocket billiards player
Winthrop Kellogg Edey (1938–1999), American collector and horologist 
Zach Edey (born 2002), Canadian basketball player

See also
Edie (name), given name and surname